Pudgy the Watchman is a 1938 Fleischer Studios animated short film starring Betty Boop and Pudgy the Pup.

Synopsis
Betty Boop hires a feline professional "Mouse Eradicator" Mr. Al E. Katz to solve her rodent woes because Pudgy isn't doing his job. But after initial successes, Mr. Al E. Katz gets drunk on the job. Betty is relieved to have Pudgy throw Katz out the window.

References

External links
Pudgy the Watchman on  Youtube
 
 

1938 films
Betty Boop cartoons
1930s American animated films
American black-and-white films
Paramount Pictures short films
1938 animated films
Fleischer Studios short films
Short films directed by Dave Fleischer
Animated films about dogs